Sundari is an Indian Malayalam-language soap opera. The show premiered on 15 November 2021 on Surya TV. It aires on Surya TV and on-demand through Sun NXT. The show portrays the life of a village belle who faces discrimination and abuse based on skin colour and aspires to assert that character is important than skin colour. It is an official remake of Kannada TV series Sundari, which itself loosely based on Tamil movie Gopurangal Saivathillai.

Plot
The plot of the story revolves around a lower middle-class girl, Sundari, who lives in a village and is often judged and treated by other villagers with inequality due to her dark skin tone. She is academically bright and aspires to become an IAS officer. Unfortunately, Sundari's father's close friend whom she considers as her own maternal uncle, Krishnan bring her an alliance in order to protect her name from the villager's accusation that she has eloped with a guy. But in a contradiction, she was admitted in hospital due to an accident while attending her examination.

Sundari's prospective groom is Karthik, Krishnan's brother-in-law, who runs his own advertising agency. Karthik believes that Sundari is not a compatible partner to him and is also in love with another woman named Vaiga, but agrees to the marriage due to his respect for Krishnan. But he does lot of tricks behind his family's back to stop the marriage but eventually fails.

After marriage, Karthik unwillingly brings Sundari with him to the city. Karthik always degrades Sundari's qualification and insults her intelligence without knowing the fact that she's a school and college topper. He thinks she knows nothing about the world as she comes from rural area. Soon Karthik leave Sundari alone and goes to Vaiga and marry her. Few months later, Karthik decides to create one plot to stay with Vaiga forever without any troubles. So he lied to his whole family that he has a dream to earn money working abroad. His friend and  elder sister knows the truth, but they agreed to protect Karthik because of his manipulative nature.

Sundari also gets attached to her land lady and her granddaughter who lost her parents at a young age looks up to Sundari as her mother. Few months later, Sundari and Vaiga gets closer after Sundari saves Vaiga's mother, Vaidehi from Asphyxiation after being locked in the car. Vaiga brings Sundari home as a caretaker for her mother who got paralyzed while finding some hunch about Karthik. Vaidehi is always suspicious about Karthik and acts sick to find the truth about him along with Sundari's help. Time passes through like this, Vaiga comes up with job offer for Sundari at her office noticing her intellectual skills and knowledge. Sundari works for Vaiga and has become very close to Vaidehi. She is been lovingly called as Collector Amma by her office colleagues and Vaiga. Karthick does not know that "Collector Amma", who Vaiga always talks about is actually Sundari. 
 
Sundari goes to her IAS coaching classes as well and there she meets a new friend named Siddarth. He is like a well wisher for her and a good friend too. Siddharth is a very kind and helping nature person as he always drops Sundari home and sometimes he motivates her whenever she seems so down.

Cast

Lead
Anjali Vinod (2021-2022) / Mariya Shilji (2022-present) as Sundari
Yuva Krishna as Karthik (2021-present)
Sruthika Suresh as Vaiga (2021-present)

Recurring
Sanif ali as Sidhu
Rhea George as Vaidehi, Vaiga's mother
Seema G. Nair as Mallika, Sundari's mother
Cherthala Lalitha as Achamma, Sundari's grandmother
Krishnathulasi Bayi as Sreedevi, Karthik's sister
Devendranath / Dileep Shankar as Krishnan, Karthik's brother-in-law
Shilpa Martin as Malini, Karthik's niece and Sundari's best friend
Sachin Joseph as Chotu
Nihas Khan as Vineeth
Jolly Easo/Roslin as Janaki
Shilpa shaji as Malini
Maya Viswanath
Maneesh Krishnan as Mike set aju
Della George as gouri
Kalabhavan Rahman as kumaran
Parvathy Rajan Shankarady as Archana
Arun MJ mohan as unni 
KPAC Rajakumar as Madhavan
Priya sobha as Laksmi 
Clinton nixon

Guest
Viviya Santh (Cameo in promo)
Santhosh Pandit

Production
Debutant Anjali was cast as the protagonist, while Yuva Krishna played the male lead. Veteran Seema G. Nair was also part of the cast. Anjali was replaced post her marriage. She later accused that she wasn't informed of her replacement and that her remuneration was still pending.

Soundtrack

Adaptations

References

External links
 Official website 

Indian drama television series
Indian television soap operas
Indian television series
Malayalam-language television shows
2021 Indian television series debuts
Surya TV original programming